Matthew Shane Ginter (born December 24, 1977) is an American former professional baseball pitcher.

After playing in colleg at Mississippi State, he made his Major League Baseball debut in 2000 with the Chicago White Sox. He was signed by the Boston Red Sox to a minor league contract, and started in 2006 pitching for the Pawtucket Red Sox. He had a strong start to the season, notably pitching eight innings of two-hit shutout baseball on April 23, and lowering his season ERA to 2.35 and his K/BB rate to 7. He was a strong candidate to be called up to the Red Sox to join the starting rotation, temporarily, while David Wells recovered from a knee injury.

Ginter exercised an out clause in his contract after going 3–9 in Pawtucket and not being called up before July 1. Ginter started 2007 with the Memphis Redbirds, the Triple-A affiliate of the St. Louis Cardinals, but after becoming a free agent, signed in late August with the Milwaukee Brewers, and was assigned to their Triple-A affiliate, the Nashville Sounds. He became a free agent after the season.

On December 21, 2007, the Cleveland Indians signed Ginter to a minor league contract with an invitation to spring training. The Indians called Ginter up to start on July 12, 2008. In his first major league appearance in three years, Ginter went five shutout innings with five strikeouts to record the win. After spending time on the disabled list, Ginter was sent outright to the minors on August 25 and became a free agent at the end of the season. In January , he signed a minor league contract with the Milwaukee Brewers. He filed for free agency after the season. 

He is not related to Keith Ginter, an infielder for MLB from 2000 to 2005.

References

External links

1977 births
Living people
Chicago White Sox players
New York Mets players
Detroit Tigers players
Cleveland Indians players
Major League Baseball pitchers
Baseball players from Kentucky
Mississippi State Bulldogs baseball players
Arizona League White Sox players
Burlington Bees players
Birmingham Barons players
Charlotte Knights players
Norfolk Tides players
Toledo Mud Hens players
Pawtucket Red Sox players
Indianapolis Indians players
Memphis Redbirds players
Nashville Sounds players
Buffalo Bisons (minor league) players
Anchorage Bucs players